The 2011 season was Santos Futebol Clube's ninety-ninth season in existence and the club's fifty-second consecutive season in the top flight of Brazilian football.

On 8 November 2010, Santos announced Adílson Batista to coach the team and his debut was on January in the Campeonato Paulista. But, on 27 February 2011, Santos sacked him although he had only one defeat in 11 matches.
Marcelo Martelotte assumed as caretaker until 5 April when Muricy Ramalho was officially announced as new coach.

On 15 May, Santos won their 19th Campeonato Paulista title beating their rival Corinthians 2–1 on aggregate in the final.
Santos also won their 3rd Copa Libertadores title, beating Uruguay's Peñarol 2–1 on aggregate after the first leg had ended scoreless in Montevideo.
As they won the Copa Libertadores, they played the 2011 FIFA Club World Cup but lost 4–0 in the final to Spanish's Barcelona.

Players

Squad information

Appearances and goals

YS= Youth system player with first team experience.

Top scorers

Disciplinary record

Copa Libertadores squad
As of 13 February 2011, according to combined sources on the official website.

In Conmebol competitions players must be assigned numbers between 1 and 25.

Source:

FIFA Club World Cup squad

Source:

Club

Coaching staff

Kits

This season was Santos' last season in which Umbro manufactured their kit.
On 2 February, Santos released the kit for Copa Libertadores. 
On 5 June, Santos released a specific kit to use on Campeonato Brasileiro.

Transfers

In

Out

 1: Included in Borges transfer.

Out on loan

Competitions

Overview

Detailed overall summary
{|class="wikitable" style="text-align: center;"
|-
!
!Total
! Home
! Away
|-
|align=left| Games played        || 77 || 39 || 38
|-
|align=left| Games won           || 37 || 24 || 13
|-
|align=left| Games drawn         || 20 || 9 || 11
|-
|align=left| Games lost          || 20 || 6 || 14
|-
|align=left| Biggest win         || 4–1 v Atlético–PR4–1 v Linense || 4–1 v Atlético–PR || 4–1 v Linense
|-
|align=left| Biggest loss        || 0–4 v Barcelona || 0–4 v Barcelona || 1–4 São Paulo
|-
|align=left| Clean sheets        || 23 || 15 || 8
|-
|align=left| Goals scored        || 123 || 68 || 55
|-
|align=left| Goals conceded      || 94 || 38 || 56
|-
|align=left| Goal difference     || +29 || +30 || -1
|-
|-
|-
|align=left| Most appearances || align=center| Rafael (68) || align=center| Rafael (37) || align=center| Rafael andDurval (31)
|-
|align=left| Top scorer  || align=center| Neymar and Borges (24) || align=center| Neymar (17) || align=center| Elano and Borges (9)
|-
|align=left| Worst discipline   || align=center| Neymar  (19)  (2) || align=center| Neymar and Elano  (9)  (1) || align=center| Neymar and EduDracena  (10)  (1)
|-
|align=left| Points             || 131/231 (%) || 81/117 (%) || 50/114 (%)
|-
|align=left| Winning rate       || (%) || (%) || (%)
|-

FIFA Club World Cup

Campeonato Brasileiro

League table

Results summary

Results by match

Matches

Campeonato Paulista

Results summary

First stage

League table

Results by round

Last updated: 17 April 2011.
Source: Futpédia
Ground: A = Away; H = Home. Result: D = Draw; L = Lose; W = Win; P = Postponed.

Matches

Knockout stage

Quarter-final

Semi-final

Finals

Copa Libertadores

Group stage

Knockout stage

Round of 16

Quarter-finals

Semi-finals

Finals

References

External links
Official Site
Official YouTube Channel

2011
Santos F.C.